Leporinus agassizii is a species of Leporinus widely found in the Amazon River basin in South America. This species can reach a length of  SL.

Etymology
It is named in honor of zoologist-geologist Louis Agassiz (1807–1873), he was the leading authority on Brazilian fishes at the time, as leader of the Thayer Expedition (1865–1866) to Brazil, which provided Steindachner with many specimens to study.

References

Garavello, J.C. and H.A. Britski, 2003. Anostomidae (Headstanders). p. 71-84. In R.E. Reis, S.O. Kullander and C.J. Ferraris, Jr. (eds.) Checklist of the Freshwater Fishes of South and Central America. Porto Alegre: EDIPUCRS, Brasil

Taxa named by Franz Steindachner
Taxa described in 1876
Fish described in 1876
Anostomidae